The 2015 CFU Boys' Under-15 Championship is the inaugural Under-15 Championship organised by the Caribbean Football Union. The competition was created following the cancellation of the CONCACAF-organised Under-15 Championship. The tournament is to prepare players for the 2017 CONCACAF U-17 Tournament.

Venues

Group stage

Group A

Group B

Group C

Knockout stage

Quarter-finals

Semi-finals

Third place playoff

Final

Awards 

Most Valuable Player  
 Nathan Bernadina
Golden Boots 
 Nathan Bernadina
Golden Glove Award
 Mario Jose Marte

References

2015–16 in Caribbean football